Alice Clere (died 1538) was the third daughter of Sir William Boleyn and his wife Margaret Ormond (otherwise Butler), the daughter and co-heiress of Thomas Butler, 7th Earl of Ormond. Alice was thus the sister of Thomas Boleyn, 1st Earl of Wiltshire, and the aunt of King Henry VIII's second Queen, Anne Boleyn.

Life
Alice married, as his second wife, Sir Robert Clere (c. 1453 – 10 August 1529) of Ormesby St. Margaret, Norfolk, the son and heir of Robert Clere and his wife Elizabeth, the daughter and heiress of Thomas Uvedale.

In 1533, Alice and her sister, Anne Shelton, were placed in charge of the household of the King's daughter, Princess Mary. Alice was also a senior member of Princess Elizabeth's household while she was living at Hatfield Palace in Hertfordshire. It has been supposed that Alice Clere was the kinder of the two guardians appointed to Mary. Anne Shelton is believed to have been harsher.

Alice died on 1 November 1538, leaving a will dated 28 October 1538 which was proved 23 January 1539. Both she and her husband were buried at Ormesby St. Margaret.

Issue
 Sir John Clere (c. 1511 – 21 August 1557) of Ormesby St Margaret and Norwich, married Anne Tyrrell, the daughter of Sir Thomas Tyrrell of Gipping, Suffolk
 Richard Clere
 Sir Thomas Clere (d. 14 April 1545)
 Edward Clere,  killed at the battle of Pinkie in 1547.

Footnotes

References

Alice
British maids of honour
16th-century English women
1538 deaths
Year of birth missing
People from the Borough of Great Yarmouth
Court of Henry VIII